Zastrozzi, The Master of Discipline is a play by Canadian playwriter George F. Walker, first produced at Toronto Free Theatre in 1977. It is loosely based upon the 1810 novel Zastrozzi: A Romance by Percy Bysshe Shelley.

Plot and characters

The major characters and the plot of the play are nearly identical with the 1810 novel Zastrozzi by Percy Bysshe Shelley.

The play is set in 1893. Zastrozzi, the master criminal of all Europe and a self-proclaimed atheist, like the character in the 1810 novel and Shelley himself, has focused for nearly three years on the pursuit of revenge against the murderer of his mother, the whimsical, inconstant, and delusively God-obsessed artiste Verezzi. In the Shelley novel, Zastrozzi's mother Olivia is seduced and impregnated by Verezzi's father when she was fifteen, Zastrozzi is the illegitimate son, Verezzi is his half-brother and Olivia dies at thirty in poverty and abandoned, demanding that Zastrozzi avenge her. In both the novel and the play, Zastrozzi, with the help of his heartless protégé Bernardo and his sometime lover, the seductress Matilda, chases Verezzi to a small town in the Italian countryside and engineers an elaborate plot to destroy his enemy. But while Verezzi may be an easy target, his tutor Victor, a former priest, presents a much more difficult challenge for Zastrozzi.

The play retains all the major characters of the Shelley novel: Zastrozzi, Verezzi, Julia, Matilda, Bernardo, and the Priest (Victor). The plot is the same in both works, and Matilda serves the same role. The novel and play take place in Italy.

The same themes are addressed in both works: Atheism, revenge, the ethical and moral debates and issues relating to retribution.

Plot summary

The theme of the play is revenge. Zastrozzi, a criminal, seeks to avenge the death of his mother for which he blames Verezzi, a quixotic, eccentric, and delusional artist. He has pursued his prey for three years and finally located him. Verezzi is protected by a tutor, Victor, who made a promise to Verezzi's father that he would look after him. Zastrozzi's partner and protégé Bernardo is assigned to murder Victor. Zastrozzi saves Verezzi for himself.

Zastrozzi, however, is not content to kill Verezzi. There are worse things than death. Zastrozzi seeks to force Verezzi to commit suicide. Verezzi is devoutly religious while Zastrozzi is a strident atheist. By killing himself, Verezzi would achieve eternal damnation based on the Christian religious precepts he upholds. This would be a supreme form of revenge. Zastrozzi wants to torture and punish Verezzi. Death would be too easy.

To manipulate Verezzi to commit suicide, Zastrozzi employs Matilda to seduce him. "Entrap him. Then destroy him." Verezzi, meanwhile, has met Julia. He proposes marriage to her. She declines. Julia is the opposite of Matilda in temperament and character. Matilda is to be the third person in this triangle. This is the plot of the play.

Verezzi has assumed a messianic mission, advocating love and human kindness. He regards himself as a saint. He is awaiting his 454 followers, which include swans and caterpillars. It is not clear whether he is pretending to be insane to throw off his pursuer. He is oblivious to the threat that Zastrozzi poses, regarding him as a "phantom" who does not exist.

Walker retains the major characters and key themes of the Shelley novel. He changes the setting to 1893 Italy and adds the new character, Victor. The themes are good versus evil, atheism and religiosity, obsession and pursuit, revenge and murder, and man overreaching the boundaries of morality to become a new Prometheus, a Miltonian Satan. Zastrozzi, Bernardo, Matilda, and Victor are also adept at swordplay which is a key element of the action. The sets are a combination of a "Piranesi prison drawing" and the ruins of an ancient city. He retains the Gothic elements of lightning and thunderstorms and swords and daggers as weapons.

Another theme is the nature of art. Who should be the judge of its merit or worth? Should there be accountability? Zastrozzi has an artist killed because of his alleged mediocrity. "To prove that even artists must answer to somebody."

Zastrozzi attacks the Belle Epoque or the Beautiful Age in European history. "What is this new age of optimism they're all talking about." He says it is a "lie" to give people "false hope". Zastrozzi explains his symbolic mission: "I am what I am. The force of darkness. The sane, clear voice of negative spirituality." He seeks to destroy mankind and the world because they are "weak" and "ugly".

Victor tells him that a new century is approaching that will usher in a new world that is better, more humane and civilized. Zastrozzi replies that the new era will not be better. Understanding this fundamental truth is better: "Understanding the truth is understanding that the force of darkness is constant."

Zastrozzi describes his objective: "It is my responsibility to spread out like a disease and purge. And by destroying everything make everything safe. Alive. Untouched by expectation. Free of history. Free of religion. Free of everything."

Revivals

The play has had several revivals, including one in the 2009 season of the Stratford Shakespeare Festival at the Studio Theatre. It was directed by Jennifer Tarver and starred Rick Roberts as "Zastrozzi", Oliver Becker as "Bernardo", Sarah Orenstein as "Matilda", John Vickery as "Victor", Andrew Shaver as "Verazzi" and Amanda Lisman as "Julia".

The play remains in continuous production throughout the world.

A production is scheduled for the 2022-2023 season by the Kitchener-Waterloo Little Theatre in Waterloo, Ontario, Canada.

References

External links

Formats and Editions of Zastrozzi: The Master of Discipline. WorldCat.
2012 production by the Carlolina Actors Studio Theatre, Charlotte, NC. "The swordplay's the thing in Zastrozzi, The Master of Discipline. CAST brings another saucy production" by Perry Tannenbaum. 2 August 2012.

1977 plays
Plays set in the 19th century
Fiction set in 1893
Plays by George F. Walker
Plays based on novels